Qamaruddin Khan may refer to:

 Qamar-ud-din Khan Dughlat Mongol ruler of Moghulistan
 Asaf Jah I, Mughal noble and founder of the Asaf Jahi dynasty
 Mir Muhammad Fazil, Mughal noble
 Bismillah Khan (born Qamaruddin Khan), Indian musician